Clifford Allan Redin Savory (born 15 September 1935) is a Zimbabwean livestock farmer and president and co-founder of the Savory Institute. He originated holistic management, a systems thinking approach to managing resources.

Savory advocates using bunched and moving livestock in an effort to mimic nature, as a means to heal the environment, stating "only livestock can reverse desertification. There is no other known tool available to humans with which to address desertification that is contributing not only to climate change but also to much of the poverty, emigration, violence, etc. in the seriously affected regions of the world." "Only livestock can save us." He believes grasslands hold the potential to sequester enough atmospheric carbon dioxide to reverse climate change. Praised by cattle farmers, his controversial ideas have sparked opposition from academics; ranging from debate on evidence for treatment effects to the scope of the potential impact for carbon sequestration.

Savory received the 2003 Banksia International Award and won the 2010 Buckminster Fuller Challenge. Prince Charles called him "a remarkable man" and noted farmer Joel Salatin wrote, "History will vindicate Allan Savory as one of the greatest ecologists of all time."

In contrast, James E. McWilliams described Savory as having "adherence to scientifically questionable conclusions in the face of evidence to the contrary". George Monbiot said of him, "his statements are not supported by empirical evidence and experimental work, and that in crucial respects his techniques do more harm than good."  However, this comment has been subject to criticism in a later article published in The Guardian by Hunter Lovins, titled "Why George Monbiot is wrong: grazing livestock can save the world".

Life

Education
Savory was educated in South Africa at what was then the University of Natal, gaining a B.Sc. in Biology and Botany in 1955.

Early work in southern Africa

Savory’s early career was multifaceted, working as a biologist, soldier, public servant, member of parliament, president of a political party, farmer, rancher, and as a consultant. The insights from these experiences eventually culminated in what is now known as Holistic Management.

His work studying the root cause of land degradation (desertification) began as early as 1955 in Northern Rhodesia (now Zambia), where he served in the Colonial Service as Provincial Game Officer for Northern and Luapula Provinces. His work continued in Southern Rhodesia (now Zimbabwe), first as a research officer in the Game Department and then as an independent scientist and international consultant.

Savory’s early research advocated for the culling of large numbers of elephants based on the belief that large numbers of grazing herbivores were destroying their own habitat, a mainstream belief that persists with many anti-livestock proponents to this day. His recommendations were not enacted during his time in the Game Department, but later in 1969 as a Member of Parliament he brought about a Parliamentary Commission of Enquiry led by George Petrides charged “to investigate and report on all aspects of wild life policy and management in Rhodesia and to make recommendations thereon." Following the recommendations of the Petrides Commission, Dr. Graham Child was appointed Director of National Parks and Wild Life Management who then implemented an elephant culling program. In a 2004 article discussing the program, Dr. Child noted that “while I was Director 30,529 [elephants] were killed, mostly on culls, and the countrywide population grew from an estimated 44,109 to 52,583 animals.”

However, this culling program did not reverse the degradation of the land as expected, and Savory has called his decision to advocate for the culling of large numbers of elephants "the saddest and greatest blunder of my life." This preventable loss of life, the result of interpreting research data to fit the prevailing world-view that too many animals causes overgrazing and overbrowsing, led to Savory becoming even more determined to understand and resolve the root cause of land degradation and to prevent others from making the same short-sighted mistakes which he attributed to applying reductionist thinking to complex living systems. This eventually led to Savory's development of a holistic framework for decision-making and to the creation of Holistic Planned Grazing, as detailed in his books, Holistic Management, Third Edition: A Commonsense Revolution to Restore Our Environment, written with his wife Jody Butterfield, and Holistic Management Handbook, Third Edition: Regenerating Your Land and Growing Your Profits, written with Sam Bingham and Jody Butterfield.

Savory was influenced by earlier work of French agronomist André Voisin who said that overgrazing resulted from the amount of time plants were exposed to animals, not from too many animals in any given area. Savory saw this as a solution to overgrazing, and believed that overgrazing was caused by leaving cattle too long and returning them too soon, rather than the size of the herd.

At the time of Unilateral Declaration of Independence in 1965, Savory was a Captain in the part-time Territorial Army unit, the 4th Battalion Royal Rhodesia Regiment. He opposed UDI quietly and continued to serve and formed a tracking unit that became the Tracker Combat Unit (TCU). After Savory’s departure from the TCU, it later evolved to become the Selous Scouts.

Political involvement
Savory was elected to the Rhodesian Parliament representing Matobo constituency in the 1970 election. After resigning from the Rhodesian Front in protest over its policies and handling of the war, in 1973 Savory reformed the defunct Rhodesia Party formerly led by Sir Roy Welensky. In June 1973, Savory publicly stated, "If I had been born a black Rhodesian, instead of a white Rhodesian, I would be your greatest terrorist." Although he urged white Rhodesians to understand why he would feel this, the reaction to this statement led to Savory's ousting from the Rhodesia Party. In 1977, other moderate white parties united in opposition to Ian Smith in what was known as the National Unifying Force (NUF) led by Savory. The NUF party won no seats in the 1977 election, and Savory relinquished leadership to Tim Gibbs, son of Rhodesia's last governor. Savory continued to fight Ian Smith and his policies, in particular opposing the Internal Settlement under Bishop Abel Muzorewa. In 1979, due to conflicts with the Smith government, Savory left Rhodesia and went into self-imposed exile to continue his scientific work.

Move to the Americas
After leaving Zimbabwe, Savory worked from the Cayman Islands into the Americas, introducing holistic planned grazing as a process of management to reverse desertification of 'brittle' grasslands by carefully planning movements of dense herds of livestock to mimic those found in nature, allowing sufficient time for the plants to fully recover before re-grazing. Savory immigrated to the US, and with his wife Jody Butterfield founded the Center for Holistic Management in 1984. Its name was later changed to the Savory Center and later Holistic Management International. In 2009 Savory left HMI and formed the Savory Institute.

Personal life
When not travelling the world spreading his message, Savory and Butterfield split their time between their house in Albuquerque and a thatched-roof complex of mud huts in the African bush in Zimbabwe. He frequently goes barefoot.

Holistic management advocacy
His 2013 TED Talk, "How to green the desert and reverse climate change," attracted millions of views and was followed up by the release of his TED Book, The Grazing Revolution: A Radical Plan to Save the Earth. In his TED Talk Savory asks, "What are we going to do?"

Savory advocates using high technology to develop alternative energy sources and to reduce or eliminate future emissions. He supports grass fed beef and vehemently opposes industrial livestock production. 

Savory condemns the practice of slash-and-burn cultivation of forests and grasslands, saying that it "leaves the soil bare, releasing carbon, and worse than that, burning one hectare of grassland gives off more, and more damaging, pollutants than 6,000 cars. And we are burning in Africa, every single year, more than one billion hectares of grasslands, and almost nobody is talking about it." One billion hectares is an area greater than that of the Sahara desert.

Praise and criticism
Thousands of farmers, ranchers, pastoralists and various organizations are working globally to restore grasslands through the teaching and practice of holistic management and holistic decision making. This includes conservation projects in the US, Africa, Mexico, Argentina, Chile, Canada, and Australia in which various NGOs, government agencies and universities are practicing holistic management and its holistic planned grazing  to reverse desertification using livestock as the main agent of change to restore the environment, increase ground cover, soil organic matter and water retention, replenish streams, and combat biodiversity loss.

In 2003 Australia honored Savory with the Banksia International Award "for the person doing the most for the environment on a global scale" and in 2010, Savory and the Africa Centre for Holistic Management won The Buckminster Fuller Challenge, an annual international design competition awarding $100,000 "to support the development and implementation of a strategy that has significant potential to solve humanity's most pressing problems".

Although Savory's approach to the problem of desertification has met resistance from scientists, three 2007 and 2010 studies document soil improvement as measured by soil carbon, soil biota, water retention, nutrient-holding capacity, and ground litter on grazed land using multi-pasture grazing methods compared to continuously grazed land. There is also evidence that multi-pasture grazing methods may increase water retention compared to non-grazed land. However, George Wuerthner, writing in The Wildlife News in a 2013 article titled, "Allan Savory: Myth And Reality" stated, "The few scientific experiments that Savory supporters cite as vindication of his methods (out of hundreds that refute his assertions), often fail to actually test his theories. Several of the studies cited on HM web site had utilization levels (degree of vegetation removed) well below the level that Savory actually recommends."

In his TED talk, Savory claimed that holistic grazing could reduce carbon dioxide levels to pre-industrial levels in a span of 40 years. According to Skeptical Science, "it is not possible to increase productivity, increase numbers of cattle and store carbon using any grazing strategy, never-mind Holistic Management [...] Long term studies on the effect of grazing on soil carbon storage have been done before, and the results are not promising.[...] Because of the complex nature of carbon storage in soils, increasing global temperature, risk of desertification and methane emissions from livestock, it is unlikely that Holistic Management, or any management technique, can reverse climate change."

According to a 2016 study published by the University of Uppsala, the actual rate at which improved grazing management could contribute to carbon sequestration is seven times lower than the claims made by Savory. The study concludes that holistic management cannot reverse climate change. A study by the Food and Climate Research Network in 2017 concluded that Savory's claims about carbon sequestration were "unrealistic" and very different from those issued by peer-reviewed studies.
 
In a 2012 address to the International Union for Conservation of Nature World Conservation Congress, Prince Charles said:

The Savory Institute was one of eleven finalists in the Virgin Earth Challenge, a 2007-2019 competition which offered a $25 million prize for whoever could demonstrate a commercially viable design that resulted in the permanent removal of greenhouse gases out of the Earth's atmosphere to contribute materially in global-warming avoidance. None of the entries satisfied all the necessary prize criteria.

Bibliography
 Books

 
 
 
 
 
 

 Articles

See also
 Agroecology
 Joel Salatin
 Tragedy of the commons

References

External links 

 Savory Institute
 Africa Centre for Holistic Management
 

1935 births
Living people
Agronomists
Climate activists
Conservationists
People from Bulawayo
People involved with desert greening
Rhodesian military personnel of the Bush War
Rhodesian politicians
Sustainability advocates
University of Natal alumni
White Zimbabwean people
Zimbabwean biologists
Zimbabwean exiles
Zimbabwean scientists
Rhodesian Front politicians
Members of the Parliament of Rhodesia
Members of the National Assembly of Zimbabwe